Trond Nilssen (born 22 August 1990) is a Norwegian actor. He is best known for playing Olav/C-1 in Kongen av Bastøy which won him an Amanda Award for Best Actor in a Supporting Role.

Film

Awards and nominations

References

External links

1990 births
Living people
Norwegian male film actors